Brian Head, at  high, is the highest peak on the Markagunt Plateau and in Iron County in southwestern Utah, United States. Brian Head Peak is located east of Cedar City and just north of Cedar Breaks National Monument in Dixie National Forest. The town of Brian Head at the western base of the mountain is the location of the Brian Head Ski Resort. 

Brian Head has the name of a government surveyor. There is a Forest Service lookout on the peak that was built in 1934–1935, and there is also a road to the summit that can be driven in summer.

See also

 List of mountains in Utah

References

External links

 
 

Mountains of Utah
Mountains of Iron County, Utah
Dixie National Forest